Jung Sung-Ho is a South Korean football player who plays for Chungju Hummel FC. He appeared in two matches of the League Cup in FC Seoul.

References

External links

Living people
South Korean footballers
FC Seoul players
Association football defenders
K League 1 players
Year of birth missing (living people)